Bilohorivka is an urban-type settlement in Sievierodonetsk Raion (district) in the Luhansk Oblast of eastern Ukraine, at about   NW from the centre of Luhansk city and at about  WSW from Sievierodonetsk. The population is  As of January 2023, Bilohorivka is one of a few settlements in the Luhansk Oblast, which is still under control of the Ukrainian Armed Forces, who are regularly repelling  attempts by Russian forces to storm the settlement.

History

2022 Russian invasion of Ukraine
According to the Governor of Luhansk Oblast Serhiy Haidai, a school in Bilohorivka was bombed by a Russian airstrike on 7 May 2022, during the Russian invasion of Ukraine, where up to 60 people died, although only 2 were confirmed. On 12 May 2022 a Russian battalion tactical group attempted to establish pontoon bridges to cross the Siverskyi Donets River. They were destroyed by Ukrainian forces, with great losses of life and equipment in the ensuing Battle of the Siverskyi Donets. The settlement would later be occupied by Russia after the Battle of Lysychansk.

On 19 September 2022, it was confirmed that Ukrainian forces had regained full control over the settlement. On 20 September 2022, Serhii Haidai, the head of the Luhansk Regional Military Administration, said that "Bilohorivka was Ukraine’s last stronghold in Luhansk Oblast. It was the area of constant heavy fighting. Our defenders have squeezed the invaders out and are in full control of the town. However, it is still under artillery fire. The town no longer exists because the invaders razed it to the ground."

Russia claims that Russian forces recaptured Bilohorivka on 3 February 2023, however, as of 7 February 2023, Ukrainian forces maintain control of the settlement.

References

Sievierodonetsk Raion
Urban-type settlements in Sievierodonetsk Raion